Jeff Coetzee and Rogier Wassen were the defending champions. They were both present but did not compete together.
Coetzee partnered with Jaroslav Levinský, but lost in the semifinals to Xavier Malisse and Jürgen Melzer.
Wassen partnered with Christopher Kas, but lost in the first round to Jeff Coetzee and Jaroslav Levinský.

Luis Horna and Juan Mónaco won in the final 6–4, 3–6, [10–7], against Xavier Malisse and Jürgen Melzer.

Seeds

Draw

Draw

External links
Draw

Doubles